By Invitation Only is a tribute album by the Michael Schenker Group released in 2011. This album, made up of songs that influenced the career of Michael Schenker, includes guest performances from members of various bands, including  Whitesnake, Blue Öyster Cult, Yngwie Malmsteen, and Iron Maiden. It's a re-release of the Heavy Hitters album from 2005, with one extra song ("Run To The Hills").

Track listing
"Run to the Hills" (Iron Maiden)
 Vocals: Robin McAuley
 Rhythm Guitar: Pete Fletcher (Pygmy Love Circus)
 Bass: Tony Franklin (ex-The Firm, Blue Murder)
 Drums: Brian Tichy (Whitesnake, Billy Idol)
"Save Yourself" (McAuley Schenker Group)
 with: Robin McAuley
"Finding My Way" (Rush)
with: Sebastian Bach (ex-Skid Row)
"All Shook Up" (Elvis Presley)
Vocals: Joe Lynn Turner (ex-Deep Purple, Rainbow)
Bass: Jeff Pilson (ex-Dokken, Dio, Foreigner)
Drums: Aynsley Dunbar (ex-Whitesnake, UFO, Journey)
"Blood of the Sun" (Leslie West)
Vocals: Leslie West (Mountain)
Bass: Rudy Sarzo (Blue Öyster Cult, ex-Dio, Quiet Riot)
Drums: Simon Wright (Dio, ex-AC/DC)
"Doctor Doctor" (UFO)
Vocals: Jeff Scott Soto (Talisman, ex-Yngwie Malmsteen)
Bass: Marco Mendoza (Soul Sirkus, Whitesnake)
Drums: Brett Chassen (Bret Michaels Band)
"War Pigs" (Black Sabbath)
Vocals: Tim "Ripper" Owens (Dio's Disciples, Yngwie Malmsteen, Beyond Fear, ex-Judas Priest, Iced Earth)
Drums: Aynsley Dunbar (ex-Journey, Whitesnake, UFO)
Bass: Mike Inez (ex-Ozzy Osbourne, Alice In Chains)
"I'm Not Talking" (Mose Allison)
Vocals: Mark Slaughter (Slaughter)
Drums: Aynsley Dunbar
Bass: Jeff Pilson
"Money" (Pink Floyd)
Vocals: Tommy Shaw (Styx)
Sax: Edgar Winter
Bass: Tony Levin (Peter Gabriel, King Crimson)
Drums: Mike Baird (Journey)
"Out in the Fields" (Gary Moore)
Vocals: Gary Barden (MSG)
Bass: Chuck Wright (Quiet Riot, ex-Alice Cooper)
Drums: Brett Chassen
"Hair of the Dog" (Nazareth)
Vocals: Paul Di'Anno (ex-Iron Maiden)
Bass: Phil Soussan (ex-Ozzy Osbourne)
Drums: Vinny Appice (ex-Black Sabbath, Dio)
"I Don't Live Today" (Jimi Hendrix)
Vocals: Sebastian Bach (ex-Skid Row)
Drums: Eric Singer (KISS)
Bass: Tony Franklin (ex-The Firm, Blue Murder)
"Politician" (Cream)
Vocals/Bass: Jeff Pilson (ex-Dokken, Dio)
Drums: Brett Chassen

References

Covers albums